A stepped gable, crow-stepped gable, or corbie step is a stairstep type of design at the top of the triangular gable-end of a building. The top of the parapet wall projects above the roofline and the top of the brick or stone wall is stacked in a step pattern above the roof as a decoration and as a convenient way to finish the brick courses.  A stepped parapet may appear on building facades with or without gable ends, and even upon a false front.

Geography 
The oldest examples can be seen in Ghent (Flanders, Belgium) and date from the 12th century: the house called Spijker on Graslei, and some other Romanesque buildings in this city. From there, they were spread in the whole of Northern Europe as from the 13th century, in particular in cities of the Hanseatic League (with brick Gothic style), then in Central Europe at the next century. These gables are numerous in Belgium, Netherlands, all Germany, Denmark, Sweden, Poland, Baltic States, Switzerland, and some parts of France (French Flanders, Eastern Normandy, Picardy and Alsace). They are also present but much rarer in the British Isles. Crow-stepped gables are especially common on traditional Flemish and Dutch houses and Danish medieval churches.

Crow-stepped gables were also used in Scotland as early as the 16th century. Examples of Scottish  crow-stepped gable can be seen at Muchalls Castle, Monboddo House, and the Stonehaven Tolbooth, all late 16th- and early 17th-century buildings. 

Nineteenth-century examples are found in North America, and the step gable is also a feature of the northern-Renaissance Revival and Dutch Colonial Revival styles.

Construction
Convenient access to the roof ridge motivated the crow-step design, along with the availability of squarish stones to accomplish this form of construction.  The access would have been convenient for chimney sweeps and roofers in earlier times, where cranes were non-existent and tall ladders were not common.

With crow steps, the roofing slates (rarely tiles) do not reach the end of the building, so making for a special problem with keeping the roof watertight. Many different schemes are found for overcoming this, some of which are described below. Terms currently used in Scotland are italicised.

 Slates may be laid to the edge of the crow step, with the last slate raised by a wedge (tilting fillet). Then mortar (lime mortar or cement) would be laid over the edge of the slate to seal the gap. Other solutions involve working with lead.
 A groove approximately 25 mm (1 inch) deep is cut into the inside edge of the steps. A lead abutment flashing is inserted into this groove, called a chase or a raggle. The lead is laid over the end slate, which is raised by a tilting fillet.
 Leading is inserted into a raggle, and used to make a trough, or secret gutter, running down the inside edge of the steps. The far edge of the trough is raised over a triangular fillet. Slates are then laid resting on that trough edge and overlapping into the trough, which is open and runs directly down to gutters (roans).
 Rather than forming a raggle, lead flashings may be placed into the joints between bricks as they are laid.

When lead is to be held into a raggle, small folded lead wedges called bats are inserted at intervals and hammered in so they expand. The raggle is then sealed with mortar.
Crow steps are frequently made of sandstone, even on buildings otherwise of granite, and it is said that the porous nature of sandstone leads to problems with water penetration. Because of this, crow steps are sometimes capped with lead or sealed with other materials.

Design variation
There are a number of variations on the basic design. One such structure is Culross Palace built in 1597 which features a veiled woman on the crow steps.  Roofs in Scotland are typically steeper than in the rest of the United Kingdom (possibly because it snows more) making for steeper and more step-like steps.

Alternative terms
The Nuttall Encyclopædia suggests this architectural feature is called corble steps. Corbie steps (from the Scots language corbie: crow) is a more common version. Another term sometimes used is craw step. In Dutch, this design is termed  ("stair-step facade"), characteristic of many brick buildings in the Netherlands, Belgium, and in Dutch colonial settlements.

A similar form is found in traditional Chinese architecture called  (pinyin: mǎtóu qiáng), which literally means "horse-head wall".

See also
Cornice
Pediment

References

External links

Roper Gate, an example of the use of crow-stepped gable

Types of wall
Roofs
Traditional Chinese architecture